Jasur Orziqulovich Hasanov (Uzbek Cyrillic: Жасур Ҳасанов; born 2 August 1983 in Jizzakh, Uzbekistan) is a footballer from Uzbekistan currently playing for Sogdiana Jizzakh. He usually plays as left midfielder.

Hasanov is a regular starter for the Uzbekistan national football team.

Club career
Hasanov started his footballing career in Sogdiana Jizzakh, a football club based in his hometown of Jizzakh, at the age of 16.

Bunyodkor
Hasanov was signed by eventual Uzbek League champions Bunyodkor in 2007. He soon became a core member of the team, leading Bunyodkor to their first ever Uzbek League championship in 2008, and again in 2009 and 2010.

In 2009, he was awarded third place in the Uzbekistan Footballer of the Year award, losing out to teammate Rivaldo, and Odil Ahmedov.

Lekhwiya
In 2010, Hasanov was loaned to Qatari club Lekhwiya. Hasanov helped them win their first ever championship in Qatar Stars League within the first year of the club's promotion to the 1st league.

On 7 July 2011, it was announced that Hasanov moved back to Bunyodkor after his loan with Lekhwiya expired.

Qatar SC
On 24 August 2011, it was again confirmed to the media that Hasanov was loaned to another Qatari club, Qatar SC, on a 1-year contract. He is set to replace Iraqi national Qusay Munir. Qatar SC chairman Nasser Al Thani expressed happiness with the deal.  "We're very happy to sign Hasanov, who put up a series of fine, consistent performances during last season with Lekhwiya.  He's a top performer with the Uzbek national team as well.  We're sure he'll be a great success at Qatar SC," said the official. He left the club after failing to claim a consistent starting eleven spot in the team.

International goals

Honours
Bunyodkor
Uzbek League: 2008, 2009, 2010
Uzbek Cup: 2008

Lekhwiya
Qatari League: 2010–11

Uzbekistan
AFC Asian Cup: 2007 (quarter-finals); 2011 (4th place)

Individual
 AFC Cup top goalscorer: 2022

References

External links
 
 
 
 

1983 births
2011 AFC Asian Cup players
2015 AFC Asian Cup players
Expatriate footballers in Qatar
Living people
Lekhwiya SC players
Qatar SC players
Emirates Club players
Qatar Stars League players
Uzbekistan international footballers
Uzbekistani expatriate footballers
Expatriate footballers in the United Arab Emirates
Uzbekistani expatriate sportspeople in the United Arab Emirates
Uzbekistani footballers
UAE Pro League players
Association football midfielders
Uzbekistan Super League players